Trifon Marinov Ivanov (27 July 1965 – 13 February 2016) was a Bulgarian professional footballer who played as a defender.

Ivanov made his debut for Bulgaria in 1988, earning 76 caps and scoring 6 goals over a ten-year international career. He appeared in the 1994 and 1998 FIFA World Cups, as well as the 1996 UEFA European Championship.

Club career
Ivanov started his career with Etar Veliko Tarnovo. He made his first team debut during the 1983–84 A Group season, and established himself as a regular player two years later. Ivanov played 62 games and scored 7 goals for Etar in the A Group.

After five seasons at Etar, Ivanov joined CSKA Sofia where he won two A Group titles, one Bulgarian Cup, and one Bulgarian Supercup. He made his debut in a 5–1 home league win over Botev Vratsa on 13 August 1988. Ivanov scored his first goal for the club on 12 October, in a 7–1 thumping of Sliven.

In January 1991, Ivanov transferred to La Liga-side Real Betis. He finished the season with 5 goals in 20 matches, but Betis were relegated to Segunda División. Whilst at Betis, he spent time out on loan at his previous clubs Etar and CSKA, before joining Swiss club Neuchâtel Xamax on a permanent basis in 1993.

In 1995, Ivanov signed with Rapid Wien, where he was a losing finalist in the 1995–96 UEFA Cup Winners' Cup. With Rapid he won one Austrian Bundesliga-title.

International career
Ivanov's international distinctions included being a member of the Bulgaria national football team that reached the fourth place in the 1994 FIFA World Cup in the United States. He also participated in the UEFA Euro 1996 in England. Ivanov's goal against Russia on 10 September 1997, in the qualifiers for the 1998 FIFA World Cup in France, was the one that clinched Bulgarian qualification. Ivanov scored six goals in 76 caps in the course of ten years with the national side.

Ivanov was famous for his long-range shots and free-kicks at goal. In Euro 96 particularly, he had a number of 40–45 yards shots at goal narrowly missing the target.

Death
Ivanov died of a heart attack on 13 February 2016.

Legacy
In 2013, a Brazilian amateur tournament was named after him.

Career statistics

International

Scores and results list Bulgaria's goal tally first, score column indicates score after each Ivanov goal.

Honours
CSKA Sofia
Bulgarian A Group: 1988–89, 1989–90, 1991–92
Bulgarian Cup: 1988–89
Bulgarian Supercup: 1989

Rapid Wien
Austrian Bundesliga: 1995–96
UEFA Cup Winners' Cup: runner-up 1995–96

Bulgaria
 FIFA World Cup fourth place: 1994

References

External links
David Squire's tribute from The Guardian (UK)

1965 births
2016 deaths
People from Veliko Tarnovo
Bulgarian footballers
Association football defenders
Bulgaria international footballers
La Liga players
FC Etar Veliko Tarnovo players
Real Betis players
FK Austria Wien players
SK Rapid Wien players
1994 FIFA World Cup players
UEFA Euro 1996 players
1998 FIFA World Cup players
PFC CSKA Sofia players
Neuchâtel Xamax FCS players
First Professional Football League (Bulgaria) players
Austrian Football Bundesliga players
Bulgarian expatriate footballers
Expatriate footballers in Spain
Bulgarian expatriate sportspeople in Spain
Expatriate footballers in Switzerland
Bulgarian expatriate sportspeople in Switzerland
Expatriate footballers in Austria
Bulgarian expatriate sportspeople in Austria
Sportspeople from Veliko Tarnovo Province